Mahumodo was an experimental hardcore/post-hardcore band from the UK formed by Mehdi Safa in 1997. 
They recorded four EPs: 'Shels', 'Bythewaters', 'Aprils' and '*Waves', all released on their own label, Shelsmusic.
The band received critical praise for both their live shows and EPs, with comparisons to American acts Deftones, Will Haven and Tool.

The band split in 2003 when founding member Mehdi Safa, started a new project *shels with Mahumodo drummer Tom Harriman.

Post Mahumodo projects
In 2003, Mehdi Safa, singer-songwriter of Mahumodo and drummer Tom Harriman started a new Project called *shels. They have since released two EPs and two albums: Wingsfortheirsmiles, Laurentian's Atoll, Sea Of The Dying Dhow and Plains of the Purple Buffalo respectively, which features members of the now defunct bands Eden Maine and Fireapple Red when touring.

Richard Chapple and Jonny Renshaw went on to form Devil Sold His Soul with vocalist Ed Gibbs. The band has released one EP (Darkness Prevails) and three albums (A Fragile Hope, Blessed & Cursed, and Empire of Light).  Drummer Tom Harriman was first in Devil Sold His Soul, but left after their EP to join *shels.

Members
Mehdi Safa (vocals 1997-2003)
Tom Harriman (bass 1997-1999)(Drums 2000-2003)
Richard Chapple (guitars 1997-2003)
Leon Neufville (drums 1997-2000)
Chris Price (bass 1999-2000)
Jonny Renshaw (guitars 2000-2003) 
Chris Griffiths (bass 2000-2002)
Nick Greenfield (bass 2003)
Steve-O (bass 2003)

Discography
Shels EP
Bythewaters EP
April's EP
Waves EP

External links
Official Site (now defunct)
Shelsmusic & *shels
Devil Sold His Soul

English post-rock groups
1997 establishments in England
Musical groups from London
Musical groups established in 1997